The Decebal Bridge crosses the lower Someş River to the central part of Satu Mare city, linking the residential districts of Soarelui and Centru Nou. It is named after the famous Dacian king Decebalus.

See also
List of bridges in Romania

References

Bridges in Romania
Bridges in Satu Mare